Carposina chersodes is a moth in the family Carposinidae. It was described by Edward Meyrick in 1915. It is found in Eritrea.

This species has a wingspan of 14 mm. Its larvae feed on Olea chrysophylla.

References

Meyerick, E. (1915). "Carposina chersodes Meyerick n. sp." Bollettino del Laboratorio di Zoologia generale e agraria della R. Scuola Superiore d'Agricoltura de Portici. 9: 333.

Endemic fauna of Eritrea
Carposinidae
Moths described in 1915
Moths of Africa